Zoysia macrantha, the prickly couch, is a type of grass. 

It is a creeping perennial plant found near the coastal dunes and inland salt marsh habitats in South Eastern Australia. Two subspecies are recognized, Zoysia macrantha subsp. macrantha and Zoysia macrantha subsp. walshii. The specific epithet macrantha is derived from Greek, meaning large flower.

References

macrantha
Plants described in 1831
Flora of New South Wales
Flora of Queensland
Flora of Tasmania
Flora of South Australia
Flora of Victoria (Australia)